Sara Isobel Arrieta Castañeda (born December 5, 1996) is a Filipino footballer who plays as a midfielder for the Philippines women's national team.

Youth and collegiate career
Castañeda has a younger brother and sister, Anicka Castañeda. She took up the sport of football at age 5, after witnessing her brother play for the Makati Football Club. She attended De La Salle Zobel for her high school studies and was part of her school's football team. During her high stint, she was awarded the Athlete of the Year twice.

Castañeda later played for the football team of her college, De La Salle University. With her team, she competed in 2016 in the UAAP Season 78 football tournaments and scored in the final against UP Lady Maroons but lost with 1–2. She became after the tournament Rookie of the Year.

International career
Before her stint with her college, Castañeda has already played for the under-16 and under-19 Philippine national football teams. She made her debut for the senior team at age 18 in May 2015 at the 2015 AFF Women's Championship. She also participated in the 2016 edition.

Castañeda helped the Philippines qualify for their first AFC Women's Asian Cup since the qualification stage was introduced. She scored 4 goals in the 2018 AFC Women's Asian Cup qualifiers in 2017 including the equalizer in the 1–1 tie against Bahrain that secured the Philippines qualification for the 2018 edition of the continental tournament.

Despite Castañeda's contribution to the qualification, she had to secure a berth for the Philippine squad that will participate at the final tournament of the 2018 AFC Women's Asian Cup. By February 2018 she was removed from the national pool but was later reinstated. She was included in the final-23 roster for the 2018 and 2022 AFC Women's Asian Cup. In the 2022 tournament where the Philippines qualified for their first ever FIFA Women's World Cup, she was mostly utilized as a substitute.

International goals
Scores and results list the Philippines' goal tally first.

References

1996 births
Living people
People from San Juan, Metro Manila
Footballers from Metro Manila
Filipino women's footballers
Women's association football midfielders
De La Salle University alumni
University Athletic Association of the Philippines footballers
Philippines women's international footballers
Competitors at the 2017 Southeast Asian Games
Competitors at the 2019 Southeast Asian Games
Southeast Asian Games competitors for the Philippines